Broniszów  is a village in the administrative district of Gmina Wielopole Skrzyńskie, within Ropczyce-Sędziszów County, Subcarpathian Voivodeship, in south-eastern Poland.

Notable people born in Broniszów 
Karol Olszewski (1846–1915) was born in the village (then Broniszów Tarnowski).

References

Villages in Ropczyce-Sędziszów County